Douglas Hopkins is a photographer whose fashion and beauty images have appeared in Vogue, W, Women's Wear Daily, Rolling Stone, Cosmopolitan, Elle, and The New York Times. Among his creative endeavors, he has done volcanic research and photography, has co-directed a science documentary film, founded a fine fragrance company, and has authored a book on photography, "Real Views", scheduled to be released in 2022.

Biography

The son of Cleveland and Lillian Hopkins, Douglas Hopkins grew up in Alaska and Boston. As a young man, Hopkins worked as a ranch hand in Montana.  In high school he spent a year in Europe studying German.  He attended the University of California, San Diego where he majored in physics and German literature.  He later attended MIT, where he became a senior staff member of the MIT Department of Earth & Planetary Sciences.

At MIT he designed and deployed a system for measuring the ballistics of volcano eruptions.  From 1971 to 1973 he worked on the top of several live volcanic sites, including the Italian islands of Sicily and Stromboli, as well as Guatemala and Chile.  Hopkins' interest in commercial photography began to emerge while taking personal close-hand photographs of volcanic eruptions. A later radio interview deemed this as the world's most dangerous job.

In 1972 Hopkins completed an intensive program in teaching visual awareness with the reclusive Massachusetts Institute of Technology photography professor, Minor White, author of The Zone System Manual and colleague of Ansel Adams.  With Dr. Kathleen Crane, Hopkins co-directed the science documentary film "Heat".  The film, funded by the Charles Lindbergh Foundation, explained geothermal phenomena.

Hopkins pursued a twenty-year career in commercial photography that has included staff, freelance, and consulting work.  He has worked for numerous fashion, beauty, travel, and general publications, and his photographs have appeared in posters, books, and on national television.  During his early years, Hopkins was innovative in the use of the computer for photography-related & business purposes, the first US photo studio to computerize, using the early, dual processor, Digital Equipment Corp (DEC) PC.

In the mid-1980s, at the beginning of the period known as perestroika, Hopkins traveled to Eastern Europe and became interested in fine fragrances found back in the USSR. After several years of negotiation the world rights to the leading Soviet men’s cologne, Prastara, were obtained. In 1989, Hopkins founded his own luxury fragrance company purveying to the world's top fashion retailers..

In January 1999, while on the Internet, Hopkins met a Russian woman, Oksana Katsuro, and began conversing with her via email. At the time, Ms. Katsuro was living and working as a nuclear engineer in Obninsk, Russia. In August 1999, Ms. Katsuro moved to New York and on November 6 of that year, she and Hopkins were married. This became a subject of the vaulted New York Times "Vows" wedding column, later reproduced with fashion magazine coverage, then interpreted in the art film "Birthday Girl", starring Nicole Kidman. Mrs. Hopkins obtained her PhD in fusion physics from Columbia University and divorced. They have one daughter, Liliana.

Most recently, Hopkins has written a textbook, "Real Views", teaching his seminar teaching studies with the famed photographer Minor White's existential method of "heightened visual awareness". This is scheduled to be released in 2023.  Hopkins currently lives in New York City and continues to direct his fragrance company.

Photography

Hopkins' approach to photography was influenced by the intensive visual awareness training program he took with MIT professor, famed, reclusive Minor White.

Some of Hopkins' early photographs of volcano eruptions appeared in popular and technical publications and textbooks.  Working in this environment could be dangerous; regarding one of these photographs, Hopkins made the notation: "About 100 feet away. Almost ate it."   During this period, his first photographic cover was published by “Harvard”, the university alumni magazine.

After assisting several Boston commercial and portrait photographers, Hopkins' first job in commercial photography was as a staff photographer for the Metropolitan Museum of Art. By the early 1980s, Hopkins had free-lanced for Women's Wear Daily, Vogue, Mademoiselle, and Self.

At that time, Hopkins was already using computers in his work to keep track of business contacts and to record photo shoot details, photo credits, and expenses. Having a technical background, he built a computer (a CPM-based Heathkit machine) and wrote early business programs.   His early computer work is described in a 1985 article which includes a picture of Hopkins with a young model in the background. He commented that this was the model's first shooting and she was so excited by the event that she fainted to the floor shortly after the photo was taken.

During his photography career, Hopkins free-lanced for W, WWD, Vogue, Connoisseur, Harvard Magazine, Rolling Stone, Mademoiselle, Elle, Barrons, Cosmopolitan, New York Times, Revlon, Clairol, and L'Oreal.  Some interesting comments on his work:

 Hopkins photographed a cover shot for W magazine that featured Calvin Klein's first, post-designer jeans; high-fashion gowns, with supermodel Janice Dickinson in a busy Times Square street. The cover was important because of the clothes worn by Ms. Dickenson and was said by the publisher of W, John Fairchild, to be the best cover of W magazine in 30 years.  Hopkins was almost struck by a taxi when shooting, grabbing the flash of a cab's color identical to the gown, the cover. A quick-acting assistant grabbed him.
 In the early 1980s, Hopkins photographed an aerial view of a Steinway Concert Grand piano, and the image became available as an art poster.  Henry Z. Steinway would say that this photograph was “The best photo of a Steinway ever made.”
 Hopkins photographed a book cover portrait for MIT professor and author Dr. Sherry Turkle.  Wired magazine published a cover story on Dr. Turkle and noted that the photo was an emblematic turning point in her life.

Among the personalities Hopkins has photographed are especially his decades aside Kerry Kennedy, the family including Caroline Kennedy, and Hillary Clinton, Tim Cook, Robert De Niro, Phoebe & Valerie Cates, Sharon Stone, Alexandra Paul, Mia Farrow & children, and Andy Warhol in Hopkins' studio, his last portrait.

Hopkins has remained active in the photography field through commissioned portraits, exhibits, design awards, articles, lecturing, and teaching at The New School in New York City. He has also served as a consultant to clients such as Polaroid and Fuji.

Regarding his new book, "Real Views", Hopkins calls it "lessons to a personal creative vision" for amateur digital photographers, a manual of heightened visual awareness.  "I would like to enhance the amateur photographer’s ability to endow lasting images of ambiance and emotion."

Media coverage

Hopkins has received professional coverage in publications such as Graphis, The New York Times (op-ed, article co-author and photography), Popular Photography (cover), American Photographer (cover), and Photo District News.  He has appeared on numerous television shows, sometimes with his wife Oksana.  Some of these shows include The Montel Show, Star Search, and Inside Edition.  He has also appeared on Internet shows such as Rocketboom.

Perfume development

In 1989, Hopkins started the fragrance company Douglas Hopkins and Company, at first based in his duplex on the Upper East Side in New York City. In industry terms, the company is referred to as an international atelier perfumer.

Hopkins' company states that his products are based on centuries-old formulas and are packaged like perfumes in a Parisian apothecary.  His products have been sold at Bergdorf Goodman in New York City, the Versaille museum, Galeries Lafayette in Paris, and others.

Hopkins' original mentor in perfume production was George Diamond, who holds many patents in perfume production.   Hopkins and Diamond had initially intended to create a "Valentina" fragrance, named for the ballerina Valentina Kozlova, whom Hopkins had photographed.  Hopkins determined that higher-quality Russian cosmetics were mostly made in Eastern Europe.

After the Berlin wall went down, Hopkins and Diamond went to Eastern Europe looking for investments.  They were invited to cosmetic factories where production was still done in a primitive manner, using mostly manual labor and horse-drawn carts.  Although Diamond had returned to the United States, on the last day of his trip Hopkins stumbled upon a tiny remote fragrance plant.  The factory was a Communist-run coop that made one fragrance called Prastara.  Hopkins acquired the Prostara trademark, which allowed him to market the fragrance worldwide, except in Russia.

Hopkins questioned the previous owners and determined that the fragrance probably originated with the chemist of Louis XV of France, because the king's mistress (and later his wife) Marie Leczinska was of Polish royalty.

As a result of his portrait work, Douglas became friends with a young German engineer and his wife who were from old European families. On one occasion when Hopkins was visiting the family at a castle in Austria, he was able to do some research on Prostara in their library.  There he discovered a rare 18th-century perfuming manual, which helped define the future direction of the company.

Douglas Hopkins' women's fragrances include Åse, Zazou, and Prastara. Men's fragrances include Prastara Royal and Prastara Blue. Hopkins describes Zazou as "the California scent with a hint of sanity."

Hopkins has an interesting perspective on the fragrance industry:

The company also sells Geothermology, a personal treatment line, launched in 2005 with 35 products.  This line "offers the volcanic and natural mineral substances derived from multiple, active, naturally occurring geothermal healing sources around the world".

References

External links
 www.PerfumeFactory.org
 www.DouglasHopkins.com
 www.picasaweb.google.com/DouglasHopkins
 www.flickr.com/photos/DoHop.

Year of birth missing (living people)
Living people
University of California, San Diego alumni
Photographers from Massachusetts
Artists from Boston